Events in the year 1816 in Norway.

Incumbents
Monarch: Charles II

Events
 26 May -  Norwegian Bible Society, the oldest interchurch organization in Norway is founded. 
 14 June - Norges Bank, the central bank of Norway is founded.

Full date unknown
 Bodø was granted township status.
 Grimstad received city rights.
 Carl Carlsson Mörner is appointed Governor-general of Norway.

Arts and literature
The oldest theatre building in Scandinavia; Trøndelag Teater was built.

Births

5 January – Jens Zetlitz Kielland, consul and artist (d.1881)
16 March – Vilhelmine Ullmann, proponent for women's rights (d. 1915)
30 May – Jacob Smith Jarmann, firearms designer (d.1894)
6 June – August Thomle, jurist and politician (d.1889)
30 July – Johan Sverdrup, politician and first Prime Minister of Norway (d.1892)
16 October – Christian Torber Hegge Geelmuyden, navy officer and politician (d.1885)
16 December – Adam Hiorth, merchant and industrial pioneer (died 1871).

Full date unknown
Paul Peter Vilhelm Breder, politician (d.1890)
Erik Jonsson Helland, Hardanger fiddle maker (d.1868)
Wilhelm Nielsen, politician

Deaths
26 March – Johan Ernst Mowinckel, merchant and consul (b. 1759).
26 July – Johan Nordahl Brun, poet, dramatist, bishop and politician (b.1745)

See also

References